Ruchey is a rural locality (a village) and the administrative center of Malyginskoye Rural Settlement, Kovrovsky District, Vladimir Oblast, Russia. The population was 1,046 as of 2010. There are 8 streets.

Geography 
Ruchey is located 6 km northwest of Kovrov (the district's administrative centre) by road. Kuznechikha is the nearest rural locality.

References 

Rural localities in Kovrovsky District